Bromford is a housing association providing affordable housing and specialist housing support services. The businesses covers a wide geographical area, predominately Central England and the South West, which includes the West Midlands, Shropshire, Staffordshire, South Gloucestershire, Cirencester, the Cotswolds, Northamptonshire and Buckinghamshire. Bromford also incorporates Bromford Homes, an outright sale business arm providing shared ownership homes to assist private/social renters move onto the property ladder.

In July 2018, Bromford successfully completed a partnership with South West-based Merlin Housing Society to create a new organisation which retained the Bromford name. Bromford now owns and manages around 46,000 homes and provides services for approximately 100,000 people living in those homes. When the partnership was concluded, Bromford confirmed plans to deliver one of the largest housing association-led new homes programmes throughout the Midlands and South West, investing £1.5bn in 14,000 new homes in the next decade, as well as extending its neighbourhood coaching way of working to even more communities.

History
In 1918 rented housing comprised 70% of the market but only a fraction of these homes were deemed to be ‘affordable’ or ‘social’. There were a number of charitable housing bodies such as the Guinness Trust and Peabody Trust, and some industrial companies who supplied rented homes for their workers but they were relatively small in number. Local authorities only started to provide rented homes in any volume after the Great War. The development of new affordable housing by [housing associations] (HA) was an objective of the established charitable organisations such as Peabody and Cadbury but they expanded only slowly until the 1960s.

Bromford Housing Association Limited, named after Bromford Bridge railway station in the Bromford area of Birmingham, was formed by a group of housing sector professionals in 1963. They formed a management committee run by quantity surveyor and Chairman Charles Bucknall, estate agent Robert Oulsnam and solicitor Keith James. In order to take advantage of loans from the new Housing Corporation an entirely new association had to be formed as a ‘society’. This became ‘Second Bromford Housing Society’.

Bromford’s first scheme was built at West Heath Road in Birmingham.

Leadership
Bromford's management team consists of CEO Robert Nettleton, chief people officer Fiona Regan, chief customer officer Rohini Mehra, chief investment officer Martyn Blackman, chief information officer Dan Goodall, chief risk officer Heather Richardson and chief finance officer Paul Walsh.

Board Members 
Bromford adopts the UK Corporate Governance Code and is made up of two executive and eight non-executive directors.
These are:
 Chair - Steve Dando
 Neil Rimmer
 Richard Bird
 Carolyn Downs
 Dame Sandra Horley
 Charles Hutton-Potts
 Jerry Toher
 Chief executive - Robert Nettleton
 Chief finance officer - Paul Walsh
 Company secretary - Sarah Beal

Bromford's Previous Executive Director Philippa Jones spoke out about the future of boards within housing in The Guardian, and highlighted the need for more non housing professionals to get involved.

Finances
In 2012, Bromford recorded a turnover of £133.6m, and a surplus of £22m (up from £17m previously). In August 2013, Bromford raised a further £60m worth of investment through private placement 
from Legal & General and Prudential subsidiary M&G, while the transaction was managed by Lloyds Bank.

HCA Funding
In 2014, Bromford received widespread coverage in housing press after the social enterprise announced it would not be bidding for Homes and Communities Agency funding. In a blog on the Bromford website, Philippa Jones told readers that grant regimes restrict progress, and that the focus should not be on number of homes built, but the impact that can be made on communities.

In 2013/14, Bromford invested £58.5m in completing 624 new affordable homes, of which £4.7m came from grant. Going forward, the organisation says it still plans to invest £335m between 2015–18, delivering about 600 homes per year

References

Housing associations based in England
1963 establishments in the United Kingdom